Port Chalmers is a town serving as the main port of the city of Dunedin, New Zealand. Port Chalmers lies ten kilometres inside Otago Harbour, some 15 kilometres northeast of Dunedin's city centre.

History

Early Māori settlement 
Overnight the tide rose and beached canoes were set adrift. As some of them swam out to reclaim the canoes those onshore cried out “Koputai!, Koputai!” When a peace was made between Kāti Māmoe and Kāi Tahu, about 1780, Koputai was one of two southern terminuses of Kāi Tahu territory. The chiefs Karetai, Te Matenga Taiaroa and Tuhawaiki and other Māori frequented Koputai.

By February 1839, the Weller brothers of Otago (modern Otakou) had set up a saw pit on the opposite side of the harbour, which appears to have been at Sawyers Bay. By September the following year a 'big boat', supposedly the schooner Anne, was under construction, apparently there. In 1840, Port Chalmers and the whole western shore of Otago Harbour (from about Burkes to Otafelo Point) was included in Te Matenga Taiaroa's sale of land to the French whalers Pierre Darmandarits and Edouard DuBern, brothers-in-law and business partners.

The first Christian service at Koputai was held by the Reverend James Watkin, the Wesleyan missionary at Waikouaiti, in 1842. Taiaroa's cousin, the chief Kohi, was the leader of the last known  at Koputai. That year Kohi fell ill, and thinking himself at the point of death, feared that his young son Timoko, would never have any benefit from a sealing boat in which he had a share. He therefore instructed his servants, Kurukuru and Rau-o-te-uri, to burn the boat where it lay on the beach at Koputai. To appease the other partners in the boat who were outraged upon hearing what he had done Kohi after consulting his wife Piro, consented at Otaheiti to be strangled as punishment. Taiaroa was given the task but upon observing his hand trembling as he was tying the knot Kohi exclaimed: "Kahore kia mataa a Taiaroa ki te mea o te taura" (Taiaroa does not know how to tie a knot). Kopi then took the rope, tied a slip-knot, and adjusted the rope about his own neck before Taiaroa pulled upon the rope tight, until he was dead. Kohi was buried at Koputai. By 1844 Koputai was deserted.

Arrival of the Europeans 
In 1844 the schooner Deborah under the command of Captain Thomas Wing  was chartered by Frederick Tuckett of the New Zealand Company to assist him in choosing a site for the projected New Edinburgh settlement. After sailing for the South on 31 March 1844 Tuckett left the ship at Moeraki on 23 April and made his way south by land in order to gaining a better appreciation of the land. The  Deborah continued south independently and anchored near Koputai in the bay now bearing its name, and where the hulk of the vessel remains. It wasn't until 26 April that Tuckett rendezvoused with the ship. Tuckett explored the harbour and its environs, which he how considered more suitable for the purposed settlement than any site he had yet seen. He departed at the end of April to explore the inland countryside, before returning to Koputai on 11 June. By this date there was established at Koputai a  makeshift jetty, two whares (Māori-style houses) and some tents. Mr. and Mrs. Lethbridge were in residence, David Scott and several others. As a result of his investigations Tuckett selected an adjoining block of land (the Otago Block) as the site for the Scottish New Edinburgh settlement and nominated Koputai as its deep-water port. The Deborah departed on 23 June leaving behind Tuckett, who was living in a small three-bedroom cottage made of loose bricks that he had built on the beach. On 15 July 1844 William Wakefield of the New Zealand Company visited accompanied by John Jermyn Symonds (representing the government) and George Clark.

The sale of the Otago Block from Māori to the Otago Association was concluded at Koputai on 31 July 1844. In December 1844 Tuckett left and returned to England, with William Davidson taking over his cottage and position as the New Zealand Company’s local representative. In that same month Alexander and Janet McKay arrived with plans to establish a public house, to service the needs of the proposed settlement. It eventually opened as the 'Surveyors' Arms' on what is now Beach Street and was licensed by Akaroa-based magistrate John Watson in 1846. On 23 February 1846 the  ship Mary Catherine anchored at Koputai. On board was Charles Kettle the surveyor to the New Zealand Company together with his wife and a staff of six assistant surveyors and 25 labourers, whose task was to survey the land that had been purchased from the Māori. kettle and his wife took up residence in Tuckett’s cottage. The survey of the town was completed in May 1846.

At first the European settlers intended to christen the settlement ‘New Leith’ or ‘New Musselburgh’, as they disliked the Māori name of Koputai; but the Lay Association of the Free Church of Scotland (later known as the Otago Association), desired that the port might be named after Dr. Thomas Chalmers, the leader of the Free Church movement in Scotland and this suggestion was adopted.

The first organized European settlers arrived in Otago Harbour on the John Wickliffe, which moored off what was now Port Chalmers on 23 March 1848. Captain Cargill who was the agent for the New Zealand Company and a small party went in the ship's boat to the head of the harbor, while the other passengers went ashore in parties to explore the land around Port Chalmers. The second ship, the Philip Laing arrived on 15 April 1848 to find a settlement surrounded by dense bush to the water’s edge except for a small clearing behind the centre of the beach and consisting of the New Zealand Company’s store, Tuckett’s former cottage and three whare (Māori huts).  At the time Port Chalmers had 400 potential sections available compared with Dunedin’s 2,000.
The arrival of organized European settlement eventually led to the town superseding the earlier Otakou as the harbour's international port. By 1849 the population had reached 38 and by January 1854 the population had reached 80, but was still less than 130 by 1861. 
In 1854 the 220 ton Nelson was the first steamer to visit the port. As Otago harbour was too shallow for large ships to reach Dunedin. Ships initially used to anchor in the stream, and the cargo was transshipped to lighters, which were towed by tugs to Dunedin at the head of the harbor. There was also a connection by steep road from North East Valley to Sawyers Bay, a spur of the main road north.  
  
On 31 May 1855 the customhouse was robbed, and a chest, containing about £1,400, was carried away, but was afterwards recovered from the harbour, where the thieves had thrown it on some rocks upon finding that they were unable to open it before daylight exposed them to potential capture.

By the 1860s a road along the side of the harbour between Dunedin and Port Chalmers had been built, which allowed ships to dock at Port Chalmers, with goods then transported to and from Dunedin by road. The Bowen pier was built in 1873, followed by the Export pier, and, later, the George Street pier.
In 1862 Dunedin and Port Chalmers were connected by a telegraph line.
A small community of workers sprang to service the docks. In spite of all this, the port was probably viewed as a temporary solution and an inconvenience, as a round trip to Dunedin took three to four hours by horse and wagon. There was also the option of a sea connection by two paddle steamers, the Golden Age (from 1863 onwards) and the Peninsula.

The discovery of gold by Gabriel Read in 1861 lead to the Otago Gold Rush which over a three month period saw 16,000 new arrivals pass through the port.  This totally transformed Port Chalmers as businesses sprung up to service both the increasing number of ships and their passengers. Despite the development the streets were still unpaved and muddy  following any heavy rain.
This dramatic increase in trade meant that by 1864, Port Chalmers had grown to be the third largest port in Australasia. with a population of at least a 1,000, with five hotels, three restaurants, six general stores, two chemists, two bakeries, two barbers, two blacksmiths, two churches,  two schools, and a Masonic Hall (which functioned during the week as a courthouse).

On 18 June 1865 a large fire consumed an entire block of building at the corner of George and Grey Streets, destroying a number of buildings. The fire was put out by local citizens and the Naval Brigade. Despite the damage caused it wasn't until 1876 that a volunteer fire brigade was organized.

Railway connection
In the early 1870s construction began on the Port Chalmers Branch railway line linking Dunedin and Port Chalmers. Originally the contractors intended for the tracks to pass down George Street to the port, but following objections from the Town Board it was conveyed via a cutting and a tunnel to emerge on Beach Street before terminating on a new wharf. Soil excavated from the tunnel was used for the reclamation of land for the new wharf on which the railway line terminated. When the railway line opened on 1 January 1873 it was the first 1,067 mm narrow gauge railway in New Zealand. The opening of this line bought to an end the lightering service between Port Chalmers and Dunedin. The branch line was subsequently incorporated into the national rail network through a connection at Sawyers Bay to the Main South Line, which was opened through to Christchurch on 7 September 1878 and Invercargill on 22 January 1879. As the Main South Line passed along the hillside above Port Chalmers a railway station locally called the “Upper Station” was built to service passengers. The terminus of the branch line on the wharf continued to service freight and was known as the “Lower Station”.   
Since roads on Otago Peninsula were non-existent, boats were used to cross the harbour. The first dedicated ferry service was introduced on the harbor in 1859 but it was not profitable. As the region’s rapidly increased due to the Gold Rush scheduled ferry services began between Port Chalmers and Portobello and ran from 1876 to 1954.
The development of the town reflected the growth of Dunedin and Otago with rivalry between the city and Port Chalmers over which would handle the bulk of shipping. The establishment of a floating dock and later a graving dock in the 1870s lead to Port Chalmers emerging as a significant ship repair center.

Dredging of the Victoria ship channel 
As Dunedin grew, and particularly with the increase in commerce that developed following the Otago Gold Rush of the 1860s, the merchants of Dunedin pushed for dredging of a channel to allow ocean-going vessels to reach the city's wharves. Though a contentious decision, it was agreed to dredge what became known as the Victoria Ship Channel along the north-western side of the harbor. The channel was finally opened in 1881. The initial channel was narrow and shallow, and did not get off to an auspicious start, as the Union Steam Ship Company's SS Penguin, the first ship to use it, was temporarily grounded while using it. As finance allowed, the channel was gradually widened and deepened, and by 1907, twice as many ships were using Dunedin's wharves as used Port Chalmers. Compensating to some degree for the opening of the Victoria Ship Channel ship servicing and building industries developed in Port Chalmers while the adjacent Carey's Bay became a fishing port. 
The year 1882 saw the inauguration of New Zealand's refrigerated meat trade when the ship Dunedin left Port Chalmers with the first such cargo.

David Alexander De Maus (1847–1925) operated a photography business in Port Chalmers and was known for his maritime photographs. In 1893 he was the first person in New Zealand to be prosecuted for selling an indecent photo (of a woman). It was possibly a reprint of a French academic study for artists that was legal in France.  This conviction didn't stop him from being elected mayor of Port Chambers four times between 1899 and 1913.

Servicing Antarctic exploration
In November 1894 the port was host to the Antarctic, a Norwegian whaling and sealing ship soon to be credited with the first substantiated landing on the Antarctic continent. While docked in Port Chalmers for repairs and restocking, several of her crew refused to continue with the voyage, and four New Zealanders were recruited several days later at Stewart Island. 
During the heroic era of Antarctic exploration the Otago Harbour Board sought to attract subsequent explorers, extending generous hospitality by way of coal, food, and complimentary use of the harbour facilities. This dangled carrot drew Robert Falcon Scott, who visited with both the Discovery in December 1901 and his final doomed Terra Nova expedition to Antarctica in November 1910. It attracted Ernest Shackleton’s Nimrod and Endurance expeditions. In 1916 Shackleton's damaged ship the Aurora was towed to Port Chalmers, repaired in Port and then returned to Antarctica. American Richard E. Byrd used Port Chalmers as the base for his Antarctic operations in 1928, Lincoln Ellsworth did likewise in 1933, and so did a number of other American, French and New Zealand explorers over the coming decades. 
In 1903 the temperance movement was successful in prohibiting the selling  of alcohol in the Port Chalmers electorate. Hotels in the town banded together, taking their case as far as the Privy Council, in London, before winning back their licences in May 1905.

By 1905 the town had a population of over 2,000 and was home to two railway stations two banks, a dairy factory, gas works, two cemeteries, a recreation reserve, two fire stations, a brass band, salt water bath, and a Mechanics' Institute. Education was provided by a District High School, a Roman Catholic school, a Technical School, and several private kindergartens. The town was protected by a  company of the Permanent Artillery, and the Garrison Artillery Volunteers. In 1906 when it was found that only 28 boys and one girl could swim out of a roll of 432 pupils at the local school could swim, swimming lessons were added to the curriculum and held in the partially-filled graving dock.
A road tunnel linking Sawyers Bay with Waitati as part of a new north motorway from Dunedin was proposed in the 1930s but never built. 
By 1961 the town had a population of 3,120.

A new faster, harbourside road from the city was completed in 1965. The selection of Port Chalmers as the South Island's first container terminal in 1971 re-established Port Chalmers as the South Island’s major commercial port to – much the dismay of the locals, who had enjoyed several generations of bohemian tranquility by this point. 
In 1979, passenger trains between Port Chalmers and Dunedin ceased after 106 years of operation. All the buildings at the Upper Station were subsequently removed.
The container traffic continued to expand and while a new expanding trade in timber developed in parallel but the greatly reduced labour needs of these trades saw the town's population contract.
Controversial attempts to site an aluminum smelter at Aramoana at the mouth of the harbour in 1975 and 1980 didn't succeed. 
From the 1970s an artists' colony grew up in Port Chalmers and Carey's Bay contributing to tensions over the port's continuing industrial development and giving a different flavour to the town. 
In 1987 the Port Chalmers Old Identities Society's collection was transferred to the old Post Office building and reopened as the Port Chalmers Museum. This has since been renamed the Regional Maritime Museum.

As a result being closer to the open sea as well as its easier berthing makes Port Chalmers the preferred port of call. In the 2018–2019 financial year 208,600 containers were handled by the port while 1.15 million tonnes of logs were exported between the Dunedin and Port Chalmers wharves.
In June 2019 a $2.9 million project was begun by Port Otago to stabilize the east and north-east sides of Flagstaff Hill and return Beach Street to its original position. A series of terraces is being created and approximately 45,000m³ of excess rock and sediment is to be removed.

Geography 
Much of Port Chalmers is located on a small hilly peninsula, at the northern end of which is a large reclaimed area which is now the site of Dunedin's container port. Close to the southeastern shore of this peninsula are a pair of islands, which lie across the harbour between Port Chalmers and the Otago Peninsula. These two islands are Quarantine Island/Kamau Taurua and Goat Island / Rakiriri. Prior to the local body reorganization in the 1980s Port Chalmers was made up of several suburbs, as well as the central area, Roseneath, Blanket Bay, Upper Junction, Brick Hill, Sawyers Bay, Mussel Bay, Upper Port Chalmers, Dalkeith, Careys Bay, Reynoldstown, Deborah Bay, Hamilton Bay, Waipuna Bay, Te Ngaru, and Aramoana, as well as the outlying townships of Long Beach, Purakanui and several other smaller nearby villages and farmsteads.
Many of the streets of Port Chalmers are named after the first immigrant vessels; hence Wickliffe, Laing, Victory, Bernicia, Mary and Ajax Streets. Scotia Street is named after early settler John Jones' favourite schooner. Burns Street is named after the Rev. Thomas Burns. Currie Street bears the name of Alexander Currie, a director of the New Zealand Company, while George and Grey Streets, bear the name of an early Governor of New Zealand, Sir George Grey. Harrington Street (while misspelt) is named after Thomas Cudbert Harington the first secretary of the New Zealand Company. Campbell Buchanan Lane commemorates a young Port Chalmers sailor who died in action in the Solomon Islands in January 1943.

Climate 
The climate of Port Chalmers in general is temperate; Under the Köppen climate classification, it is classified as oceanic climate.

Demographics 

Port Chalmers had a population of 1,407 at the 2018 New Zealand census, a decrease of 12 people (-0.8%) since the 2013 census, and an increase of 27 people (2.0%) since the 2006 census. There were 630 households. There were 690 males and 717 females, giving a sex ratio of 0.96 males per female. The median age was 45.2 years (compared with 37.4 years nationally), with 249 people (17.7%) aged under 15 years, 177 (12.6%) aged 15 to 29, 711 (50.5%) aged 30 to 64, and 270 (19.2%) aged 65 or older.

Ethnicities were 93.8% European/Pākehā, 12.2% Māori, 1.7% Pacific peoples, 2.6% Asian, and 2.8% other ethnicities (totals add to more than 100% since people could identify with multiple ethnicities).

The proportion of people born overseas was 17.9%, compared with 27.1% nationally.

Although some people objected to giving their religion, 65.9% had no religion, 22.4% were Christian, 0.2% were Hindu, 0.4% were Buddhist and 1.9% had other religions.

Of those at least 15 years old, 369 (31.9%) people had a bachelor or higher degree, and 216 (18.7%) people had no formal qualifications. The median income was $29,200, compared with $31,800 nationally. 177 people (15.3%) earned over $70,000 compared to 17.2% nationally. The employment status of those at least 15 was that 540 (46.6%) people were employed full-time, 189 (16.3%) were part-time, and 54 (4.7%) were unemployed.

Economy

Creative arts 
The creative arts are still important to the area's economy; Port Chalmers and the surrounding suburbs of Careys Bay, Deborah Bay, Roseneath and Sawyers Bay have a thriving arts community of painters, potters, musicians, jewelers, sculptors and writers.

Tourism
From the 1990s onwards cruise ships began calling at Otago Harbour, a trend that continues to expand with 153,000 disembarking of the 229,000 passengers bought on 115 vessels (104 into Port Chalmers) during the 2018–2019 season.

Manufacturing / Industry

Port 
The Customs Department was initially responsible for control of Otago Harbour with the Collector of Customs acting as harbor master, until 1859 when the Provincial Council took responsibility and appointed a dedicated harbor master. 
The Otago Harbour Board was established on 30 June 1874 and took over responsibility for the harbour and the provision of facilities, the wharves at Port Chalmers were managed by the Railways Department until 1928.
The commissioning of the graving dock in March 1872 (which had cost £56,069 2s 11d) and the increasing size of ships resulted in reduced demand for the floating dock which was finally beached at Carey’s Bay. The remains of the dock are still visible as late as the 1940s.

Owing to the need to accommodate increasingly larger vessels a new graving dock was constructed by the Otago Dock Trust between 1905 and 1909 at a cost of £74,475. Once the dock was completed the Otago Dock Trust merged with the Otago Harbour Board on 21 May 1910.
Following its taking over operation of the wharves from the Railway Department the Otago Harbour Board moved its headquarters to Port Chalmers in 1929.
The first all-container ship to visit New Zealand was the Columbus New Zealand, which berthed at Beach Street Wharf on 26 June 1971, before the container terminal had been built. It used its own on-board crane whose arm folded out to land or pick up containers from the wharf.
The redevelopment lead to the closing in 1975 and filling in of the graving dock while the wharves were replaced by two berths – the later multi-purpose berth is to the right – and a heavy-duty paved space for storing, washing and devanning (unpacking) containers.
In 1988 the Otago Harbour Board was replaced by a quasi-autonomous local government entity, Port Otago Ltd.

The port currently has three berths suitable for handling containerized, multi-purpose, and conventional vessels; Beach St, the container berth and the multi-purpose three berths.

Quarrying 
A quarry known as the “Big Quarry” was opened on Church Street in March 1866 and operated until it closed in the 1920. This supplied Port Chalmers brecia locally known as bluestone which was used in the foundations of the Dunedin Railway Station, the Otago Boys’ High School, the University of Otago Clocktower, Dunedin Town Hall and in the Port Chalmers Graving Dock and to construct many other buildings in the area. The site is now home to the Lady Thorn Rhododendron Dell.

Ship building 
Beginning with the construction of the 13-ton schooner Sarah which was launched in 1859  shipbuilding became an important activity at Port Chalmers. Notable following vessels were the 70-ton steamer Taiaroa (1865), the 50-ton schooner Maid of Otago (1870), the 70-ton schooner Friendship (1871) and the 70-ton schooner Mary Ogilvie (1873). In 1861 William Isbister constructed at Carey’s Bay the first patent slip of its kind in New Zealand. He soon built a second slip and on them carried out ship repairs and built a number of small vessels, among them the paddle steamer Tuapeka (1863), 28-ton schooner Cymraes (1864) and the dredge New Era (1867).   Other shipbuilders based at Port Chalmers were Sutherland & McKay, Knewstubb Brothers (from the late 1880s until 1905), Miller Bros, Miller & Tunnage and Morgan & Cable.  Morgan & Cable later changed its name first to the Maori Iron Works and later in 1906 to Stevenson & Cook which during the Second World War built seven Castle class minesweepers at Boiler Point for service with Royal New Zealand Navy. Boiler Point took its name from an abandoned ship's boiler. After the war the company built the penstocks for the Roxburgh Power Station, before eventually closing in 1958, due to a diminishing workload. The company’s facilities were taken over by Sims Engineering Ltd who built tugs and in 1984 launched the 1,056-ton dredge New Era, as of 2006 the largest powered vessel built in New Zealand. Sims closed in about 1990.

Ship repair 
The construction of the floating dock and then the graving dock allowed the port to establish itself as a centre of ship repair. The Union Steam Ship Company was established in Dunedin in 1875 and in the same year established a workshop at Port Chalmers to repair both its own and other companies’ ships. The company purchased the hulk of the barque ‘’Don Juan’’ in 1878 and moored it between the Bowen and George Street piers where it was used as a carpenters’ workshop and sailmakers loft. As demand for the workshop’s services increased in 1889 the company moved its workshops and sailmakers loft to an existing three-storey building before in 1897 the company constructed a new much bigger building on reclaimed land with further expansion in the following year. Up until 1920  Port Chalmers was the company’s main repair facility until in that year the company moved its headquarters to Wellington followed by the establishment of its main repair centre in that city. The facilities at Port Chalmers declined in importance until they finally closed in 1975.
Between 1920 and 1930 a large number of the Norwegian whaling vessels based at Stewart Island were refurbished by the workshops of the Union Stream Ship Company. The Second World War was a particularly busy period due to repairs being required on vessels damaged by the enemy.

Governance 
Until 1853 public works were undertaken by the Governor of New Zealand and from thereafter by the Provincial Government, but little was spent on local development. In 1855 the town obtained a directly elected representative on the  Provincial Government  when the council was restructured into eight electable districts of which the town was one. The town obtained its first directly elected local governance when a nine member Town Board was formed in 1860 following the passing of the Port Chalmers and Invercargill Town Board ordinance in 1859.
On 9 April 1866 the town became a municipality and then a borough in 1884. The first mayor of the borough was Daniel Rolfe. By 1905 the borough was divided into four wards—High, East, Middle and South. 
Sir John Thorn (1911–2008) was mayor of Port Chalmers from 1956 for 33 years consecutive years until the borough of Port Chalmers and the whole surrounding district was dissolved and amalgamated into enlarged City of Dunedin in 1989. His service made him the longest serving mayor of New Zealand (as of 2016).
Today Port Chalmers elects councillors to the Dunedin City Council as part of the Waikouaiti-Chalmers Ward, and is served by a local Community Board, the Chalmers Community Board.

List of mayors 
Between 1878 and 1982, Port Chalmers had at least 23 mayors. The following is an almost complete list:

Culture 

The creative arts are important to the area's economy; Port Chalmers and the surrounding suburbs of Careys Bay, Deborah Bay, Roseneath and Sawyers Bay have a thriving arts community, and the town is base for those living an alternative lifestyle. 
Various artists and musicians have lived in Port Chalmers, most notably late Māori artist Ralph Hotere. Hotere's former studio was on land at the tip of Observation Point, the large bluff overlooking the container terminal. When the port's facilities were expanded, part of the bluff was removed, including the area of Hotere's studio, despite strenuous objection from many of the town's residents. Part of the bluff close to the removed portion is now a sculpture garden, organized in 2005 by Hotere and featuring works by both him and by other New Zealand modern sculptors.

Events 
The biannual Seafood Festival takes place in September.

Attractions / amenities

Churches 
 Iona Church
 Holy Trinity Church
St Mary, Star of the Sea Roman Catholic Church. Designed by Frank William Petrie this church held its first mass on 12 May 1878. Owing to a shortage of funds the planned spire was not built. Later the original stone facade was plastered over.

Historic buildings and equipment
Municipal Building (Town Hall). The foundation stone was laid on 3 November 1888, and the building opened on 25 September 1889. It was originally built to house the Port Chalmers Town Hall, as well as  the Town Clerk’s office, the Fire Brigade, the Police Station (including the Sergeant’s residence and cells), Court Rooms, Customs Office and Government Shipping Office. There was also a morgue that occupied a backroom downstairs. By the 1950s most of the government departments had ceased to use their offices, and when the courthouse closed in 1952, the library moved in to the old courtroom (which is today the foyer). When the fire brigade moved to a new site, its part of the building was used by various community groups. A major redevelopment of the whole building was completed in 2004, with the library and service centre moving into the area previously occupied by the fire brigade.

 Time ball. This was established in 1867 on the flagpole on top of Observation Point to assist in maritime timekeeping. Removed in 1970, a replacement was installed in 2020.

Tunnel Hotel. This establishment located at 22 Beach St claims to be the oldest hotel south of Nelson, and the oldest continually operated business in New Zealand. It stands on the site of the 'Surveyors' Arms' which was opened by Alexander and Janet McKay sometime after their arrival in December 1844 and was licensed to sell alcohol by the Akaroa-based magistrate John Watson in 1846. It later changed its name to the Port Chalmers Hotel and finally to the  Tunnel Hotel. The current building dates from 1875.

Museums, art galleries, and libraries 

Port Chalmers Maritime Museum is a small museum, being owned and operated by Port Otago between 2020 and 2055.  It was previously owned and operated by the Port Chalmers Historical Society Inc, formerly the Port Chalmers Early Settlers and Old Identities Association, founded in September 1913. Their collection was transferred to former Post Office building (built in 1877) which reopened as the Port Chalmers Museum in 1987, and has since been renamed the Regional Maritime Museum.

Memorials 
Scott Expedition Memorial. Upon news of the death of Captain Scott and members of his party reaching New Zealand, the Port Chalmers Borough Council in March 1913 decided to erect a memorial cairn on Height Rock, overlooking the harbour. Paid for largely by public subscriptions the foundation stone was laid on 13 December 1913 and it was formally unveiled by Prime Minister W.F. Massey on 30 May 1914. The structure, designed by architect Robert Burnside, consists of a tall and gently tapering column of Port Chalmers bluestone, surmounted by an anchor. On the landward side is inset a marble tablet inscribed with (inter alia) the names of those who perished: Captain Robert Falcon Scott, Edward Adrian Wilson, Captain Lawrence E.G. Oates, Lieutenant Henry R. Bowers and Petty Officer Edgar Evans.

Parks and recreation 
Lady Thorn Rhododendron Dell. Following the closing of the “Big Quarry” on Church Street in 1920 It was then used in the 1950s as a tip where dunnage timber from visiting  cargo ships was burnt. When this practice stopped in the 1960s it was used as rubbish dump and then became overgrown. Lady Constance Thorn ( -1997), a former long- time mayoress of the town, came up with the idea of turning the area into a dell of rhododendrons. The Port Chalmers and District Lions Club helped in 1998 to develop the garden, which they now maintain. A lookout accessed by stairs features a selection of old historic photographs of Port Chalmers over the years and also offers a view of the town and Otago Harbour.

Hotere Garden Oputae. The former studio of noted artist Ralph Hotere  (1931–2013) was on land at the tip of Observation Point, the large bluff overlooking the container terminal. When the port's facilities were expanded in 1993, part of the bluff was removed, including the area containing Hotere's studio (after strenuous objection from many of the town's residents). Part of the bluff close to the removed portion are converted by the Hotere Foundation Trust with the assistance of the Otago Harbour Board into a sculpture garden in 2005 containing featuring works by both Hotere and by other noted New Zealand modern sculptors. The sculptures were previously displayed at Hotere’s studio and include:  “Black Phoenix II” by Ralph Hotere, “Brick Column” by Russell Moses, “They do cut down the poles that hold up the sky” by Shona Rapira Davies and “Aramoana” by Chris Booth. In 2008 the garden by Design and Garden Landscapes Ltd won the Landscape Industries Association of NZ premier award for the best use of native plants, a gold award for landscape horticulture and a silver award for landscape design.

Infrastructure

Transportation 
State Highway 88 connects Port Chalmers to Dunedin. 
A public bus connection is provided to Dunedin by buses organized by the Otago Regional Council.

Utilities
In 1871 Thomson Brothers were given permission to construct a gasworks and a gas reticulation system.  The gasworks was erected on Mount Street and by June 1872 the town was being lit by ten gas powered lamps with a gas supply to a number of houses soon following. In April 1888 the Port Chalmers Gas Company  was formed and took over the gas system. They moved the gasworks to Mussel Bay and expanded the reticulation system. The Borough Council took over the system in 1918. From 1906 the wharves were lit by electricity but it wasn't until 1914 that electricity began to be supplied to the rest of the town.

Education 
From the time of the first settlement there were a number of small private schools in Port Chalmers with some remaining in existence in one form or another until the end of the 19th century.

Public 
Following the proclamation of Port Chalmers and outlying districts as an Education District a public school opened on 20 October 1856 in a building shared with the Magistrates Court on the corner of Grey and Scotia Streets with pupils have to pay a fee. By 1859 the school had 36 pupils. In 1860 a dedicated school house was erected, by which time the roll had increased to 166. With the school continuing to expand both its number of school rooms and pupils it was designated as the Port Chalmers Grammar School in 1869. In 1872 the school had a staff of four teaching 238 pupils. In 1875 staff and 401 pupils moved to a new school building  constructed on what had been previously the Police Camp Reserve. In 1879 the grammar school became the Port Chalmers District High School.  In 1929 it reverted to being a primary school. Port Chalmers School had a roll of  students as of

Roman Catholic 
In 1882 St Mary’s School was established and initially operated from a shed-like house. In 1898 Mother Mary MacKillop, and two Josephite Sisters, arrived into Dunedin on the request of the parish priest of Port Chalmers to assist with teaching. When they arrived they found the existing school house to be in a sad state of disrepair. As a result of Mackillop, her follow sisters and the community’s endeavours a new school, St Joseph’s Primary School, was opened at the end of January 1898. MacKillop lived in Port Chalmers for two months and was the first Head of St Joseph’s in Port Chalmers, teaching the Upper Standards. The second St Joseph’s School building was opened in 1913 and was a splendid two-story brick building that became a feature of the Port Chalmers landscape. The Sisters of St Joseph continued to run the school until 1979 before handing the role over to lay teachers. In 1987 the third St Joseph’s School was built and as of 2020 it is a state-integrated, co-educational Catholic primary school. St Joseph's School had a roll of  students as of

Media 
Parts of 2016 drama The Light Between Oceans starring Michael Fassbender, Alicia Vikander and Rachel Weisz was filmed here in 2014, notably the bookshop and haberdashery scenes. During shooting the main street was covered in gravel and thousands of people turned up each day hoping to catch a glimpse of the actors.

Notable people 

Pinky Agnew, actor and author.
Orpheus Beaumont, inventor of the Salvus lifejacket.
Arthur Winton Brown, Mayor of Wellington.
Jean Begg, welfare worker and administrator
Learmonth White Dalrymple, educationalist.
William Dow Duncan, All Black rugby union player.
David Elliot, Illustrator and writer of children's books.
John Grenell, real name John Hore, Country and Western Singer.
Ralph Hotere, artist.
Mary MacKillop (Saint Mary of the Cross), Australia's first saint, lived for several months in Port Chalmers.
Nadia Reid, Folk singer/songwriter.
Robert Scott, musician.
Dougal Stevenson, television personality.
William Thompson, ship captain from Alloa
Sir John Thorn, Kt OBE JP mayor for 33 years
E. T. C. Werner, sinologist and diplomat.

Ship
Port Chalmers was also the appellation of a ship which sailed between England, Australia and New Zealand at the beginning of the 20th century. It was torpedoed in mid-October 1940 and sank, with some crew surviving 14 days at sea on the lifeboat.

Notes

References

Further reading

External links 

Port Chalmers community website

 
Suburbs of Dunedin
Populated places in Otago
Ports and harbours of New Zealand
Port cities in New Zealand